J. Cole: 4 Your Eyez Only is a documentary directed by J. Cole and Scott Lazer, and produced by Cole, Tim Grant, Ibrahim Hamad and Adam Roy Rodney. It premiered on April 15, 2017 on HBO.

Premise
Incorporating music from the album 4 Your Eyez Only,  Cole captured stories of residents in Baton Rouge, Louisiana, Atlanta, Georgia, Ferguson, Missouri, his father's hometown, Jonesboro, Arkansas and his hometown, Fayetteville, North Carolina. Entertainment Weekly reported, "The documentary promises to illustrate how their struggles over viable housing, voting laws for felons, integration, and more mirror the frustrations felt across the nation." The documentary included security camera footage of a SWAT raid  that took place on March 18, 2016 at Cole's North Carolina home studio, which served as inspiration for the track "Neighbors". Cole also previewed new music in the documentary. Cole spoke about the documentary with The New York Times saying:

Release
On March 24, 2017 HBO announced their second documentary with Cole titled, J. Cole: 4 Your Eyez Only, following Forest Hills Drive: Homecoming in 2016. he documentary aired April 15, 2017 on HBO and HBO Now. The documentary was exclusively screened at the Troxy in London on April 19, 2017. On May 1, 2017 the film was uploaded on  Dreamville's YouTube channel.

Reception

Critical response
Writing for Billboard, J'na Jefferson praised the film saying it "brings black perseverance to the forefront".

Accolades

See also 
 Eyez

References

External links 

J. Cole
HBO documentary films
2017 films
2010s American films